is a mountain on the border of Chino and Minamimaki, Nagano Prefecture, Japan. This mountain is one of the major mountains of Yatsugatake Mountains. Mount Iō literally means, sulphur mountain.

Outline 
Mount Iō is a stratovolcano in Southern Yatsugatake Volcanic Group. This mountain also belongs to the Yatsugatake-Chūshin Kōgen Quasi-National Park.

Route

This mountain is one of the major mountains in Yatsugatake Mountains, which is easy for climbers to reach to the top. The easiest route is from Sakurazawa.

Access 
 Minotoguchi Bus Stop of Suwa Bus
 Tatsunokan Bus Stop of Suwa Bus

Gallery

References
 硫黄岳 - Yamakei Online

Io
Io